JK 96 Light Steel Helmet is a Chinese copy of the American Personnel Armor System for Ground Troops helmet. The liner is a copy of the American Riddel suspension system. Being manufactured since 1996 for Chinese service only

The Chinese PASGT-style helmet is not made of composite material, but rather from light steel.

The helmet is worn by some elements of the People's Liberation Army and police SWAT teams in China to replace Soviet-era headgear.

The JK 96b is a version of the JK 96a with a different nylon lining.

Users

: Imported from China.

References

External links
 Chinese helmets

Combat helmets of the People's Republic of China